The 2011 STP 400 was a NASCAR Sprint Cup Series motor race held on June 5, 2011 at Kansas Speedway in Kansas City, Kansas. Contested over 267 laps on the 1.5-mile (2.4 km) asphalt D-oval, it was the 13th race of the 2011 Sprint Cup Series season. Brad Keselowski of Penske Racing won the race. Dale Earnhardt Jr. finished second, and Denny Hamlin finished third.

Report

Background

Kansas Speedway is one of ten intermediate to hold NASCAR races. The track's turns are banked at fifteen degrees, while the front stretch, the location of the finish line, is 10.4 degrees. The back stretch, opposite of the front, is at only five degrees. The racetrack has seats for 82,000 spectators.

Before the race, Carl Edwards led the Drivers' Championship with 445 points, and Kevin Harvick stood in second with 409. Jimmie Johnson was third in the Drivers' Championship with 408 points, six ahead of Dale Earnhardt Jr. and sixteen ahead of Kyle Busch in fourth and fifth. Kurt Busch with 377 was three ahead of Matt Kenseth, as Clint Bowyer with 365 points, was nine ahead of Tony Stewart, and twelve in front of Ryan Newman. In the Manufacturers' Championship, Chevrolet was leading with 83 points, six ahead of Ford. Toyota, with 64 points, was 24 points ahead of Dodge in the battle for third.

Practice and qualifying

Two practice sessions were held before the race on Friday. The first session lasted 80 minutes long, while the second was 90 minutes long. Greg Biffle was quickest with a time of 31.917 seconds in the first session, less than one-tenth of a second faster than Edwards. Kasey Kahne was third, followed by Stewart, Jeff Gordon, and Earnhardt Jr. Bobby Labonte was seventh, still within a second of Biffle's time. In the second practice session, Joey Logano was fastest with a time of 31.732 seconds, only one-hundredth of a second quicker than second-placed Gordon. Brian Vickers took third place, ahead of Mark Martin, Paul Menard and Landon Cassill. Kyle Busch only managed 7th place.

Forty-five cars were entered for qualifying, but only forty-three raced because of NASCAR's qualifying procedure. Kurt Busch clinched his 13th pole position during his career, with a time of 30.901 seconds. He was joined on the front row of the grid by Juan Pablo Montoya. Kyle Busch qualified third, Vickers took fourth, and Logano started fifth. Jamie McMurray, Edwards, Martin Truex Jr., Menard, and Harvick rounded out the first ten positions. The two drivers who failed to qualify for the race were Tony Raines and T. J. Bell, who had times of 31.820 and 31.846 seconds.

Results

Qualifying

Race results

Standings after the race

Drivers' Championship standings

Manufacturers' Championship standings

Note: Only the top five positions are included for the driver standings.

References

STP 400
STP 400
NASCAR races at Kansas Speedway
June 2011 sports events in the United States